Hajdúhadház is a town in Hajdú-Bihar county, in the Northern Great Plain region of eastern Hungary.

Geography

Twin towns – sister cities

Hajdúhadház is twinned with:
 Łęczna, Poland (1996)

References

External links

 in Hungarian

Populated places in Hajdú-Bihar County